Prionapteryx serpentella is a moth in the family Crambidae. It is found in North America, where it has been recorded from Florida, Louisiana, North Carolina and South Carolina.

References

Ancylolomiini
Moths described in 1908